Pablo F. Fenjves is an American screenwriter and ghostwriter based in Los Angeles, California. His screenwriting credits include the 1995 film The Affair, Man on a Ledge, released in January 2012, and a string of television movies. Fenjves ghostwrote the book If I Did It, an account of the O. J. Simpson murder case.

Born in Caracas, Venezuela, on 16 August 1953, to Hungarian survivors of The Holocaust, Fenjves went to college in Illinois. His first journalism job was in Canada. He joined the National Enquirer in Florida in the late 1970s, where he befriended Judith Regan.

Fenjves has ghostwritten more than a dozen books, including two number one New York Times Best-Sellers (Witness and Blood Brother). Fenjves also ghostwrote the autobiographies and memoirs of Bernie Mac, Janice Dickinson, and music producer David Foster.

If I Did It
Fenjves collaborated with O. J. Simpson to ghostwrite If I Did It, an account of the O. J. Simpson murder case. The book was pulled by the publisher just weeks before its release date, but it was subsequently revived by Fred Goldman, father of murder victim Ron Goldman, and spent five weeks on The New York Times Best Seller list. Fenjves had a personal connection to the Simpson case: Fenjves lived a few doors down from the Brentwood murder scene, and had testified against Simpson regarding the time at which he heard Nicole Simpson's dog barking.

References

External links

1956 births
Ghostwriters
Jewish American screenwriters
Living people
O. J. Simpson murder case
Venezuelan Jews
Venezuelan male writers
Venezuelan people of Hungarian-Jewish descent
Venezuelan emigrants to the United States
Writers from Caracas
People from Brentwood, Los Angeles
Screenwriters from California
20th-century American screenwriters